Order of Saint James may refer to the following Orders of knighthood :

 Order of Santiago, also known as the Military Order of Santiago, a Catholic chivalric order and monarchical order founded in Castile
 Military Order of Saint James of the Sword, a Catholic chivalric order, founded in Portugal
 Order of St. James of Lucca, Catholic, suppressed in favor of the military Order of Our Lady of Bethlehem for the defence of the Greek island of Lemnos